An acting president is a person who temporarily fills the role of a country's president when the incumbent president is unavailable (such as by illness or a vacation) or when the post is vacant (such as for death, injury, resignation, dismissal). The following articles detail the constitutional role of an acting president in various countries:

Vice President of Chile
Acting President of France
Acting President of Georgia
Acting Head of State of Germany
Interim and Acting President of Israel
Acting President of Italy
Acting President of Moldova
Acting President of Pakistan
Acting President of Poland
Acting President of Russia
Acting President of Sri Lanka
Acting President of Turkey
Acting President of the United States

See also 
 Interim management
 Provisional government

Government occupations
Presidencies